Presidential elections were held in the Republic of the Congo on 21 March 2021. Incumbent president Denis Sassou Nguesso was re-elected with 88% of the vote. His main opponent, Guy Brice Parfait Kolélas, died a day after the elections.

Electoral system 
The President of the Republic of the Congo is elected for a five-year term, with the possibility of a maximum of two reelections. In the election, only the candidate who obtains an absolute majority of valid votes is elected. If no candidate reaches that majority, the two candidates with the highest votes face a second round twenty-one days after the results are announced by the Constitutional Court.

Conduct
Telecommunications were cut off during election day at a national level, mirroring events from the 2016 elections, a situation that was condemned by international organizations such as the African Union.

Results
Guy Brice Parfait Kolélas, the opposition presidential candidate, died from COVID-19 on a plane en route to France for treatment, on the afternoon of the election. Sassou Ngessou was reelected with 88.4% of the vote.

References

Congo
Presidential election
Congo
Presidential elections in the Republic of the Congo